If the Stars are Gods is a science fiction novel by American writers Gregory Benford and Gordon Eklund,  published in 1977. It is an expansion of the Nebula Award-winning short story, first published in Universe 4 (1974).

Plot summary
The novel is a series of stories about Bradley Reynolds, Earth's first space hero. While Part One (Mars exploration), and Part Two (alien encounter) are stand alone stories, the latter sections deal with the life systems of Jupiter and are interconnected.

Reception
C. Ben Ostrander reviewed If the Stars are Gods in The Space Gamer No. 12. Ostrander said:

Reviews
Review by Douglas Barbour (1977) in Vector 81 
Review by Richard Lupoff (1977) in Algol, #29, Summer-Fall 1977 
Review by Brian M. Stableford (1978) in Foundation, #14 September 1978

References

1977 American novels
1977 science fiction novels
American science fiction novels